Zeiraphera lariciana is a species of moth of the family Tortricidae. It is found in China (Hebei, Heilongjiang) and Japan.

The wingspan is 14–17 mm.

The larvae feed on Larix gmelini.

References

Moths described in 1980
Eucosmini